Granite Hills High School is a California Distinguished School, public and comprehensive high school located in El Cajon, California and serves students in grades nine through twelve. Opened in 1960, Granite Hills is one of thirteen high schools in the Grossmont Union High School District. GHHS is the home of the Eagles. Granite Hills High School has been an IB World School since July 2001.

History

Shooting
Just minutes after lunch ended and fifth period began on March 22, 2001, an 18-year-old former student, Jason Hoffman, arrived on campus with a 12-gauge shotgun (with size 7 or 8 birdshot) and a .22 pistol, opening fire outside the attendance office which also houses the principal and vice principals' offices. Five people were injured by shrapnel or suffered severe symptoms from the traumatic experience, but few victims incurred bullet wounds. Hoffman was shot in the buttocks and jaw. Hoffman was arrested by police officer Rich Agundez, who had been on campus during school hours since the shooting two weeks earlier at Santana High School. Hoffman would later commit suicide by hanging himself from bedsheets in his prison cell in November 2002.

Recent history
Recently, Granite Hills has been undergoing some construction to many of its classes. The football field has also been renovated.

It was discovered that Granite's soil contains a large amount of carcinogens. As of January, 2009, studies were in progress and the source of contamination was unknown. Tainted dirt has also been found at other schools in the district.
In January 2009 the long time eagle statue, "Ernie", was ripped off of its base by vandals and destroyed.

Granite Hills Marching Band
The students in the GHHS Marching Band perform at the Mother Goose Parade, Christmas in the lights, Alpine Parade, and at every home football game especially the Homecoming game. The marching Eagles also go to "Band Night" featuring the SDSU Marching Aztecs and gathering other marching bands from the GUHSD District. Popular tunes such as the "007 Theme" and "Bon Jovi Theme" highlight the "GUHSD Marching Band and Color Guard Field Show Extravaganza" held every year. During second semester they do winter and spring concerts as the "Concert Band". Some are joint concerts with middle schools from Cajon Valley School District.

Athletics
Granite Hills offers every California Interscholastic Federation sanctioned sport.

Notable alumni

Joe Cardona, 2010, NFL, New England Patriots long snapper, Super Bowl LI and Super Bowl LIII Champion
Brian Giles, 1989, Major League Baseball right fielder, San Diego Padres and previously Cleveland Indians and Pittsburgh Pirates
Marcus Giles, 1996, Major League Baseball second baseman, San Diego Padres, Atlanta Braves
Duncan D. Hunter, 1994, Republican former U.S. Representative of California's 50th congressional district.
Jimmie Johnson, 1993, NASCAR; 7-time (2006, 2007, 2008, 2009, 2010, 2013, 2016) NASCAR Cup Series champion (tied for most all-time with Richard Petty and Dale Earnhardt); 2-time Daytona 500 champion (2006 & 2013).
David Lee, 1999, U.S. Olympic Volleyball Team, 2008 and 2012
John H. Ritter, 1969, award-winning author of young adult novels
Joe Roth, 1973, former All-American quarterback at the University of California, Berkeley
Julia Schultz, 1997, model and actress
Shane Spencer, 1990, Nippon Professional Baseball outfielder, Hanshin Tigers and previously Major League Baseball New York Yankees, Toronto Blue Jays, Texas Rangers, Cleveland Indians, and New York Mets
Travis Taijeron, MLB player for the New York Mets
Tommy Vardell, 1987, NFL  San Francisco 49ers, Cleveland Browns and Detroit Lions

See also

List of high schools in California
List of high schools in San Diego County, California
List of high schools in Grossmont Union High School District

References

External links
Granite Hills High School website
Western Association of Schools and Colleges Directory of Accredited Schools 2005-2006 (PDF)

Educational institutions established in 1960
High schools in San Diego County, California
International Baccalaureate schools in California
Public high schools in California
Education in El Cajon, California
1960 establishments in California